Gonzalo Colsa Albendea (born 2 April 1979) is a Spanish retired footballer who usually played as a central midfielder.

He amassed La Liga totals of 340 matches and 29 goals over 14 seasons, representing in the competition Racing de Santander (two spells), Atlético Madrid, Valladolid and Mallorca.

Club career
A product of Racing de Santander's youth academy, Colsa was born in Santander, and he appeared sporadically with the first team (with an unassuming Segunda División stint with CD Logroñés in between) during his first four seasons, although he scored three goals in 19 games in 2000–01, with the Cantabrians being relegated from La Liga.

After representing Atlético Madrid, Real Valladolid and RCD Mallorca, Colsa returned to Santander for 2006–07 campaign, as an undisputed starter and one of the team's captains. In the second season in his second spell he played all the matches as Racing achieved a first-ever qualification to the UEFA Cup, and netted two times.

Colsa retired in June 2013 at the age of 34, after featuring rarely for second-tier side CD Mirandés. Starting in March 2015 he went on to work as an assistant coach under former Racing teammate Pedro Munitis, at that club and SD Ponferradina.

International career
Colsa was part of the Spain squad that won the 1999 FIFA World Youth Championship in Nigeria, contributing four appearances to the feat. He made his debut for the under-21s on 9 October of that year, in a 2–1 home win against Israel for the 2000 UEFA European Championship qualifiers.

Club statistics

Honours
Atlético Madrid
Segunda División: 2001–02

Spain U20
FIFA World Youth Championship: 1999

References

External links

1979 births
Living people
Spanish footballers
Footballers from Santander, Spain
Association football midfielders
La Liga players
Segunda División players
Segunda División B players
Rayo Cantabria players
Racing de Santander players
CD Logroñés footballers
Atlético Madrid footballers
Real Valladolid players
RCD Mallorca players
CD Mirandés footballers
Spain youth international footballers
Spain under-21 international footballers